Gregory Ray (born August 3, 1966) is an American former race car driver.

After winning the SCCA national Formula Atlantic championship in 1993, he moved up to the CART-sanctioned Toyota Atlantic series in 1994.

In 1997 he made his Indy Racing League debut driving for Thomas Knapp in an unsponsored black #97 car.  He made his mark on the series a year later during qualifying for the 1998 Indianapolis 500.  Driving the same, plain, black #97, he qualified second behind A. J. Foyt's driver Billy Boat.  The car attracted sponsorship from local businesses and the national anti-tobacco campaign, and became known as Ash Kicker Racing. Though he failed to finish that race, he scored several good results in subsequent races and caught the eye of successful businessman and team owner John Menard Jr.

In 1999 he won the IRL championship on the strength of three victories.  However, 2000 was a difficult season with only one victory.  He qualified on pole for the Indianapolis 500 but subsequently finished last (33rd).  In 2001 Ray and Menard had split, and his replacement Jaques Lazier won his first victory at the Chicagoland Speedway.

Things continued to go downhill from there, as Ray bounced around three separate cars in 2002 before starting his own team in 2003, Access Motorsports, the lone team utilizing a Panoz chassis with Honda engines.  He gained sponsorship from TrimSpa but failed to light up the scoreboard and in 2004, he ran a few races before giving his seat to former Infiniti Pro Series champion Mark Taylor.  The team closed at the end of the year from a lack of sponsorship.

Ray had 5 wins in his 74 IRL starts.

Racing career

IndyCar career

Early years
Greg Ray made his debut Indy Racing League start during the 1997 portion of the 1996-97 Indy Racing League season driving the #97 Thomas Knapp Motorsports Dallara-Oldsmobile Aurora in 5 of 10 events including the Indianapolis 500 where he would finish 25th due to a water pump failure. Ray's best finish came at the True Value 500 at Texas Motor Speedway near Ray's hometown of Dallas, Texas to finish 29th-place finish in points.

For 1998 Ray would continue to drive Knapp's #97 Dallara-Oldsmobile Aurora with sponsorship from Mercury Outboards and Mercury Marine for the opening rounds of the season. However, during practice for the Indianapolis 500 Knapp's team was without a sponsor. Ray would manage to qualify second between A. J. Foyt Enterprises teammates Billy Boat and Kenny Brack and would gain race day sponsorship from Justice Brothers, Inc., True Value, The Nashville Network, and Ray's hometown track Texas Motor Speedway. In the race, Ray led for 18 laps before retiring on lap 167 due to a gearbox failure. Ray would follow up his 500 performance with a 2nd-place finish at the True Value 500 at Texas Motor Speedway where Ray acquired sponsorship from AT&T but Knapp's team skipped races due to a lack of sponsorship. Ray then drove a two-race stint for A. J. Foyt Enterprises in the #11 Conseco Dallara-Oldsmobile Aurora as a replacement to the injured Billy Boat (who beat Ray to the pole position at Indianapolis and the win at Texas) at the Pep Boys 400K at Dover Downs International Speedway where Ray would set the fastest lap before getting taken out in a crash and the VisionAire 500K at Lowe's Motor Speedway where Ray retired with gearbox failure. Knapp then reopened his team for the final three races of the season with sponsorship from Genoa Racing and Best Access Systems but would retire from each race.

Championship winner
Knapp's team then closed its doors for good due to a lack of sponsorship but Ray was signed on to drive the #2 Glidden/Menards Dallara-Oldsmobile Aurora and would take pole positions at the MCI WorldCom 200 at Phoenix International Raceway and the VisionAire 500K at Lowe's Motor Speedway (the latter of which was cancelled due to an accident that killed three spectators). Ray would retire from the first three races before getting three wins at Radisson 200 and Colorado Indy 200 Presented by Deloitte & Touche both at Pikes Peak International Raceway and the MBNA Mid-Atlantic 200 at Dover Downs International Speedway to get the championship (Ray's only time in the top 10 in points).

Downturn
For 2000 Ray would continue to drive for Menard in the #1 Conseco/Quaker State/Menards Dallara-Oldsmobile Aurora scoring six poles in the series' nine races including the Indianapolis 500 where during the IRL's split with CART Chip Ganassi Racing, a CART team, entered a pair of cars for CART drivers Juan Pablo Montoya and Jimmy Vasser with Montoya starting second to Ray. Because of this Ray and Montoya were the favorites to win. Ray would lead 26 of the first 66 laps before crashing on lap 67 and finishing in 33rd (last) place with Montoya leading 167 of the 200 laps on his way to an easy win. Ray would go on to win the Midas 500 Classic at Atlanta Motor Speedway. However, Ray would drop to 13th in points.

In 2001 Ray would continue to drive for Menard in the #2 Johns Manville/Menards Dallara-Oldsmobile Aurora. Ray continued to be an excellent qualifier with four poles in the series' first ten races but had trouble finishing races with a win at the zMax Atlanta 500 Classic at Atlanta Motor Speedway. Ray's relationship with Menard got even worse after the Indianapolis 500 where Ray qualified 2nd and would lead 40 laps before finishing 17th, 8 laps down. Ray split from Menard after the Belterra Resort Indy 300 at Kentucky Speedway while Ray's replacement, Jaques Lazier won in his second race in the car at the Delphi Indy 300 at Chicagoland Speedway. Ray would drive the season ending Chevy 500 at Texas Motor Speedway returning to A. J. Foyt's team in the #11 A. J. Foyt Racing Dallara-Nissan Infiniti where Ray would start 13th and finish 8th in his only other top 10 of the year besides his Atlanta win.

Starting off 2002 without a ride Ray was hired to drive the #11 Harrah's Dallara-Chevrolet for A. J. Foyt Enterprises in place of the injured Eliseo Salazar. Ray made his 2002 debut at the Indianapolis 500 starting 31st and crashing after 28 laps and finishing in 33rd, last, place again. Ray continued to drive Foyt's #11 (later #41 when Salazar returned) through the Gateway Indy 250 at Gateway International Speedway. Ray would then drive for Sam Schmidt Motorsports in the #20 Dallara-Chevrolet with sponsorship from Empress Casino and Young Chevrolet in the final two races of the season. Ray's best finish of 2002 was a 12th at the Boomtown 500 at Texas Motor Speedway in Foyt's #11 car. This led to a 23rd-place finish in points.

Fielding his own cars

Without a ride for 2003 Ray started his own team called Access Motorsports fielding Ray in the #13 Trim Spa Panoz G Force-Honda. The team started out strong with a 9th-place finish at the Indy Japan 300 at Twin Ring Motegi and followed that up with an 8th-place finish at the Indianapolis 500. Ray would equal his 8th-place finish at the Kansas Indy 300 at Kansas Speedway, the Emerson Indy 250 at Gateway International Speedway, and the Chevy 500 at Texas Motor Speedway. In addition, Ray would have 5th place qualifying efforts at the SunTrust Indy Challenge at Richmond International Raceway and the Belterra Casino Indy 300 at Kentucky Speedway. Ray would finish 15th in points despite missing three races.

In 2004 Ray looked to be in good shape after a respectable 2003 season. Ray acquired sponsorship from Renovac for the opening rounds on his #13 Panoz G Force-Honda and would have a 2nd place start at the Indy Japan 300 at Twin Ring Motegi. But prior to the Indianapolis 500 the team was without sponsorship but Ray was able to get sponsorship from Rent-A-Center due to the company being based in Ray's home town of Plano, Texas. After Indianapolis Ray fielded his own cars without sponsorship at the Bombardier 500 at Texas Motor Speedway and the SunTrust Indy Challenge at Richmond International Raceway getting a 7th-place finish at Texas. But soon a lack of sponsorship caught up to Ray as he had to withdraw from the following race, the Argent Mortgage Indy 300 at Kansas Speedway. Ray would quietly finish 23rd in points and the team closed up shop at the end of the season.

Ray soon afterwards retired from racing after being unable to find a drive for the 2005 season.

Other racing

SCCA career
Ray started off his career by driving in various divisions of the SCCA by first attending SCCA driving schools in September 1991. By 1992 Ray is competing in several SCCA-sanctioned Formula Ford 2000 series. In that season Ray had 7 podium finishes and set a track record lap for a Formula Ford 2000 car at Sears Point Raceway and would take the series championship.

In 1993 Ray moved up to the Formula Atlantic series and would take the championship in series in dominating fashion.

CART career

In 1994 Ray moved to CART's version of the Atlantic championship, the Player's/ Toyota Atlantic Championship continuing to drive the same car he won the 1993 championship with. Ray would dominate this series also with wins at Phoenix International Raceway, Mosport International Raceway, and the Milwaukee Mile. Ray would have seven other podium finishes, six pole positions, and eight fastest laps with the championship.

By 1996 Ray was competing in the PPG/ Firestone Indy Lights Championship Powered by Buick driving for Team KOOL Green in the #27 KOOL Lola-Buick V6. Ray's best race of the season came at the race at the Milwaukee Mile where Ray started 4th and finished in 2nd place. Ray would finish in 12th place in the overall championship.

IROC career

After winning the 1999 Pep Boys Indy Racing League championship Ray drove a Pontiac Firebird Trans Am, representing the Pep Boys Indy Racing League. Ray had a best finish of 7th at the race at Talladega Superspeedway and would also start 2nd at the Indianapolis Motor Speedway race. Ray would finish in 11th place in the championship.

Racing record

SCCA National Championship Runoffs

American open–wheel racing results
(key) (Races in bold indicate pole position)

American Continental Championship results

Atlantic Championship

Indy Lights

IndyCar Series

 1 The 1999 VisionAire 500K at Charlotte was cancelled after 79 laps due to spectator fatalities. Ray had qualified for the pole position.

Indianapolis 500

External links 
GregRayRacing.com
 

1966 births
Racing drivers from Dallas
Indianapolis 500 drivers
Indianapolis 500 polesitters
Indy Lights drivers
IndyCar Series champions
IndyCar Series drivers
Atlantic Championship drivers
IndyCar Series team owners
International Race of Champions drivers
Living people
SCCA National Championship Runoffs winners
U.S. F2000 National Championship drivers
Arrow McLaren SP drivers
A. J. Foyt Enterprises drivers
Andretti Autosport drivers